The 2011 Meath Intermediate Football Championship is the 85th edition of the Meath GAA's premier club Gaelic football tournament for intermediate graded teams in County Meath, Ireland. The tournament consists of 15 teams, with the winner going on to represent Meath in the Leinster Intermediate Club Football Championship. The championship starts with a group stage and then progresses to a knock out stage.

This was St. Ultan's first year in the grade since 2008. They were relegated after 2 years as a senior club.

On 25 September 2011, Moynalvey claimed their 2nd Intermediate championship title when they defeated Gaeil Colmcille 0-15 to 1-10, succeeding Nobber as Intermediate champions.

Cortown were relegated from this grade in 2011, after 5 years as an Intermediate club.

Team changes
The following teams have changed division since the 2010 championship season.

From I.F.C.
Promoted to S.F.C.
 Nobber  -  (Intermediate Champions)

Relegated to 2011 J.A.F.C.
 Kilmainhamwood

To I.F.C.
Relegted from S.F.C.
 St. Ultan's

Promoted from 2010 J.A.F.C.
 Ballinabrackey - (Junior 'A' Champions)

Participating teams
The teams taking part in the 2011 Meath Intermediate Football Championship are:

Group stage
In the group stage there are three groups called Group A, B and C. The top two teams from each group go through to the knock-out stages of the tournament and the teams that finish last in the three groups will play in the relegation playoff.

Group A

Round 1:
 Clann na nGael 0-12, 1-8 Castletown, Kilmainham, 17/4/2011,
 Moynalvey 1-10, 1-8 St Colmcilles, Seneschaltown, 17/4/2011,
 St. Ultan's  -  Bye,

Round 2:
 St Ultans 0-16, 3-7 St Colmcilles, Slane, 30/4/2011,
 Moynalvey 2-7, 1-9 Castletown, Walterstown, 1/5/2011,
 Clann na nGael  -  Bye,

Round 3:
 St Ultans 2-11, 3-11 Clann na nGael, Trim, 15/5/2011,
 Castletown 1-12, 0-9 St Colmcilles, Duleek, 15/5/2011,
 Moynalvey  -  Bye,

Round 4:
 St Ultans 0-12, 2-12 Moynalvey, Walterstown, 9/6/2011,
 Clann na nGael 3-8, 0-12 St Colmcilles, Rathkenny, 11/6/2011,
 Castletown  -  Bye,

Round 5:
 St Ultans 0-7, 0-15 Castletown, Kells, 7/8/2011,
 Clann na nGael 1-8, 3-9 Moynalvey, Trim, 7/8/2011,
 St. Colmcille's  -  Bye,

Group B

Round 1:
 Dunderry 0-10, 1-11 Gaeil Colmcille, Bohermeen, 16/4/2011,
 Syddan 2-10, 2-10 Carnaross, Moynalty, 17/4/2011,
 St. Michael's  -  Bye,

Round 2:
 St Michaels 1-10, 1-15 Carnaross, Kells, 30/4/2011,
 Syddan 0-9, 1-4 Gaeil Colmcille, Carlanstown, 1/5/2011,
 Dunderry  -  Bye,

Round 3:
 Dunderry 2-9, 0-9 St Michaels, Kilskyre, 14/5/2011,
 Carnaross 3-4, 2-10 Gaeil Colmcille, Moynalty, 15/5/2011,
 Syddan  -  Bye,

Round 4:
 St Michaels 0-8, 1-10 Syddan, Drumconrath, 10/6/2011,
 Dunderry 0-14, 1-8 Carnaross, Pairc Tailteann, 11/6/2011,
 Gaeil Colmcille  -  Bye,

Round 5:
 St Michaels 1-8, 0-19 Gaeil Colmcille, Kilmainham, 6/8/2011,
 Dunderry 0-12, 1-7 Syddan, Pairc Tailteann, 6/8/2011,
 Carnaross  -  Bye,

Group C

Round 1:
 Ballinabrackey 1-12, 1-5 Cortown, Trim, 16/4/2011,
 Na Fianna 2-10, 1-10 Ballinlough, Athboy, 16/4/2011,
 Longwood  -  Bye,

Round 2:
 Longwood 0-4, 0-11 Ballinlough, Trim, 1/5/2011,
 Na Fianna 2-14, 1-6 Cortown, Boardsmill, 1/5/2011,
 Ballinabrackey  -  Bye,

Round 3:
 Longwood 0-10, 2-8 Ballinabrackey, Summerhill, 14/5/2011,
 Cortown 0-2, 0-8 Ballinlough, Carnaross, 14/5/2011,
 Na Fianna  -  Bye,

Round 4:
 Longwood 1-9, 0-14 Na Fianna, Trim, 12/6/2011,
 Ballinabrackey 0-5, 0-10 Ballinlough, Athboy, 12/6/2011,
 Cortown  -  Bye,

Round 5:
 Na Fianna 1-6 , 0-8 Ballinabrackey, Longwood, 5/8/2011,
 Longwood 0-11, 0-10 Cortown, Athboy, 7/8/2011,
 Ballinlough  -  Bye,

Knock-out stages

Relegation play-off

Game 1: St Ultans 0-11, 1-10 St Michaels, Kells, 21/8/2011,

Game 2: St Ultans 1-10, 0-9 Cortown, Kilmainham, 27/8/2011,

Game 3: Cortown 1-5, 0-14 St Michaels, Simonstown, 9/9/2011,

Finals

Quarter-finals
 Na Fianna 0-12, 2-9 Dunderry, Kildalkey, 20/8/2011,
 Ballinlough 3-7, 1-3 Clann na nGael, Kells, 21/8/2011,

Semi-final
 Moynalvey 3-5, 1-5 Dunderry, Pairc Tailteann, 10/9/2011,
 Gaeil Colmcille 0-10, 0-9 Ballinlough, Pairc Tailteann, 10/9/2011,

Final
 Moynalvey 0-15, 1-10 Gaeil Colmcille, Pairc Tailteann, 25/9/2011,

References

External links

Meath Intermediate Football Championship
Meath Intermediate Football Championship